Observation Hill is a steep  hill adjacent to McMurdo Station in Antarctica and commonly called "Ob Hill." It is  frequently climbed to get good viewing points across the continent. Regular clear skies give excellent visibility.

Observation Hill is a lava dome and one of many volcanoes comprising the Hut Point Peninsula.

Memorial Cross

After their deaths in early 1912, the last members of Robert Falcon Scott's party were found by a search party led by the surgeon Edward L. Atkinson. The relief party took their photographic film, scientific specimens, and other materials. The bodies of Scott and his men were left in their tent, and later parties could not locate the campsite, since that area had been covered in snow. A century of storms and snow have covered the cairn and tent, which are now encased in the Ross Ice Shelf as it slowly inches towards the Ross Sea. In 2001, glaciologist Charles R. Bentley estimated that the tent with the bodies was under about 75 feet (23 m) of ice and about 30 miles (48 km) from the point where they died; he speculated that in about 275 years the bodies would reach the Ross Sea, and perhaps float away inside an iceberg.

The search party returned to their base camp in McMurdo Sound to await the relief ship. After it arrived, they worked to build a memorial – a nine-foot wooden cross, inscribed with the names of the fatal party and the final line of the  Alfred Tennyson poem "Ulysses", which reads "To strive, to seek, to find, and not to yield." On 22 January 1913, after a difficult two-day sledge journey, the cross was erected on the summit of Observation Hill, overlooking the camp and facing out towards the "Barrier" – the Ross Ice Shelf, on which Scott's party had died. In 1972, the cross was declared as one of the initial Historic Sites and Monuments in Antarctica by the Antarctic Treaty signatories, as HSM-20.

See also
McMurdo Station
Winter Quarters Bay

References

External links
Photo of cross

Hills of Ross Island
McMurdo Station
Historic Sites and Monuments of Antarctica
Volcanoes of Ross Island
Lava domes
History of the Ross Dependency